Idols 2003 was the first season of Idols Denmark. Christian Mendoza won over Mirza Radonjica.

Finals

Finalists
(ages stated at time of contest)

Live Show Details

Heat 1 (24 September 2003)

Heat 2 (1 October 2003)

Heat 3 (8 October 2003)

Live Show 1 (22 October 2003)
Theme: Film Songs

Live Show 2 (29 October 2003)
Theme: Disco

Live Show 3 (5 November 2003)
Theme: 1980s

Live Show 4 (12 November 2003)
Theme: Danish Songs

Live Show 5 (19 November 2003)
Theme: Motown

Live Show 6 (26 November 2003)
Theme: Big Band

Live Show 7 (3 December 2003)
Theme: Christmas / The Beatles

Live Show 8: Semi-final (10 December 2003)
Theme: Love Songs

Live final (17 December 2003)

References

External links
Official Website via Web Archive

Season 01
2003 Danish television seasons